Norberto Ferreira (born 5 April 1919) was an Argentine weightlifter. He competed in the men's heavyweight event at the 1952 Summer Olympics.

References

External links
 

1919 births
Possibly living people
Argentine male weightlifters
Olympic weightlifters of Argentina
Weightlifters at the 1952 Summer Olympics
Place of birth missing
Pan American Games medalists in weightlifting
Pan American Games bronze medalists for Argentina
Weightlifters at the 1951 Pan American Games
20th-century Argentine people
Medalists at the 1951 Pan American Games